Matabeleland North is a province in western Zimbabwe. With a population of 749,017 as of the 2012 census, it is the country's second-least populous province, after Matabeleland South, and is the country's least densely populated province. Matabeleland North was established in 1974, when the original Matabeleland Province was divided into two provinces, the other being Matabeleland South. In 1997, the province lost territory when the city of Bulawayo became its own province. Matabeleland North is divided into seven districts. Its capital is Lupane, and Victoria Falls and Hwange are its largest towns. The name "Matabeleland" is derived from the Matabele or Ndebele people, the province's largest ethnic group.

Matabeleland North is bordered by Matabeleland South and Bulawayo to the south, Midlands to the east, Mashonaland West to the northeast, Botswana to the west, and Zambia to the north, which is separated from Zimbabwe by the Zambezi river. It is the largest in area of the country's ten provinces. Matabeleland North is located on the edge of the Kalahari Basin, giving it an arid climate. Its economy is dominated by agriculture, with 83% of employed people in the province working as farmers. Cattle ranching and tourism also contribute to the economy. The Zimbabwean side of Victoria Falls, a World Heritage Site and major tourist attraction, is located in Matabeleland North.

Geography 

The region of Matabeleland, of which Matabeleland North is a part of, is characterized by generally inhospitable land when compared to other parts of Zimbabwe.  It has lower rainfall than provinces such as Mashonaland, and is plagued by water scarcity in general.  The land is also less fertile than other provinces, as commercial crops cannot be grown and rural farmers usually cannot produce enough maize to feed their families.  However, during the colonial era, large numbers of cattle ranches were formed and cattle ranching has proved to be more successful than growing crops in the province. The upper reaches of the Nata River flow through Matabeleland North before entering Botswana to discharge to the Makgadikgadi Pans.

The region does have a significant amount of other resources like gold, limestone, methane gas, coal, and timber.  As seen in Hwange National Park, Zimbabwe's largest game reserve, the area is also known for its substantial wildlife population.  However, the most famous geographic feature of Matebeleland North is Victoria Falls, the world's largest waterfalls that are located on the Zambezi river on the northern border of the province.

Government

Districts 
Matabeleland North is divided into 7 districts:

 Binga
 Bubi
 Hwange
 Lupane
 Nkayi
 Tsholotsho
 Umguza

Elections 
The region is regarded as a very independent region when it comes to politics.  In the most recent parliamentary election held in March 2008, both factions of the MDC won a total of eight seats from the Matabeleland North delegation to the House of Assembly, while ZANU-PF won four seats and one other seat was won by an independent.  In the Senate, the MDC won a combined five seats and ZANU-PF won one seat.

See also
 Provinces of Zimbabwe
 Districts of Zimbabwe

References

 
Provinces of Zimbabwe
1974 establishments in Rhodesia